Armârôs (Aramaic: תרמני, Greek:) was the eleventh on a list of 20 leaders of a group of 200 fallen angels called Grigori or "Watchers" in the Book of Enoch. The name means "cursed one" or "accursed one". The name 'Armaros' is likely a Greek corruption of what may be an Aramaic name; Armoni is possibly the original (according to this, he may be identified as Armoniel, also mentioned in chapter 7 in the Book of Enoch). Michael Knibb, Professor of Old Testament Studies at King's College London, lists the meaning of his name as being "the one from Hermon".

"Then sware they all together and bound themselves by mutual imprecations upon it. And they were in all two hundred; who descended in the days of Jared on the summit of Mount Hermon, and they called it Mount Hermon, because they had sworn and bound themselves by mutual imprecations upon it." - Book of Enoch

See also
 List of angels in theology

References 

Watchers (angels)